Margaret Olwen MacMillan,   (born December 23, 1943) is a Canadian historian and professor at the University of Oxford. She is former provost of Trinity College, Toronto, and professor of history at the University of Toronto and previously at Ryerson University (now Toronto Metropolitan University). MacMillan is an expert on history and international relations.

MacMillan was the 2018 Reith lecturer, giving five lectures across the globe on the theme of war under the title The Mark of Cain, the tour taking in London, York, Beirut, Belfast and Ottawa.

Family
Margaret MacMillan was born to Dr Robert Laidlaw MacMillan and Eluned Carey Evans on December 23, 1943. Her maternal grandfather was Major Sir Thomas J. Carey Evans of the Indian Medical Service. The senior Evans served as personal physician to Rufus Isaacs, 1st Marquess of Reading, during the latter's term as Viceroy of India (1921–26). Her maternal grandmother, Olwen Elizabeth, Lady Carey Evans, was a daughter of David Lloyd George, Prime Minister of the United Kingdom, and his first wife, Dame Margaret Lloyd George.

Education
MacMillan received a Bachelor of Arts (BA) degree in history from the University of Toronto, where she attended Trinity College. She holds a Bachelor of Philosophy (BPhil) degree in politics from St Hilda's College, Oxford, and a Doctor of Philosophy (DPhil) degree from St Antony's College, Oxford. Her doctoral dissertation was on the social and political perspectives of the British in India: it was titled "Social and political attitudes of British expatriates in India, 1880–1920" and was submitted in 1974.

British popular historian and television presenter Dan Snow is her nephew.

Academic career
From 1975 to 2002, she was a professor of history at Ryerson University in Toronto, including five years as department chair. She was Provost of Trinity College, Toronto from 2002 to 2007. From 2007 to 2017, she was Warden of St Antony's College, Oxford, and Professor of International History at the University of Oxford. In December 2017, she became an honorary fellow at Lady Margaret Hall, Oxford.

She is the author of Women of the Raj. In addition to numerous articles and reviews on a variety of Canadian and world affairs, MacMillan has co-edited books dealing with Canada's international relations, including with NATO, and with Canadian–Australian relations.

From 1995 to 2003, MacMillan co-edited the International Journal, published by the Canadian Institute of International Affairs. She previously served as a member of the National Board of Directors of the CIIA, now the Canadian International Council, and currently sits on the International Journal's Editorial Board. She was the Young Memorial Visitor at Royal Military College of Canada in 2004 and delivered the J.D. Young Memorial Lecture on November 24, 2004.

MacMillan's research has focused on the British Empire in the late 19th and early 20th centuries and on international relations in the 20th century. Over the course of her career, she has taught a range of courses on the history of international relations. She is a member of the European Advisory Board of Princeton University Press.

Recognition and honours
 
Her most successful work is Peacemakers: The Paris Peace Conference of 1919 and Its Attempt to End War, also published as Paris 1919: Six Months That Changed the World. Peacemakers won the Duff Cooper Prize for outstanding literary work in the field of history, biography or politics; the Hessell-Tiltman Prize for History; the prestigious Samuel Johnson Prize for the best work of non-fiction published in the United Kingdom and the 2003 Governor General's Literary Award in Canada.

MacMillan has served on the boards of the Canadian Institute for International Affairs, the Atlantic Council of Canada, the Ontario Heritage Foundation, Historica and the Churchill Society for the Advancement of Parliamentary Democracy (Canada). She is a Fellow of the Royal Society of Literature, an Honorary Fellow of St Antony's College, Oxford and a Senior Fellow of Massey College, University of Toronto. She has honorary degrees from the University of King's College, the Royal Military College of Canada and Ryerson University, Toronto.

She was made an Officer of the Order of Canada in February 2006. She was promoted to Companion of the Order of Canada on December 30, 2015, the highest grade of the honour. In 2017 while Theresa May was in power (among the New Year's honours of 2018), she was appointed a Member of the Order of the Companions of Honour.

On May 29, 2018, MacMillan received an Honorary Doctor of Letters from Memorial University in Newfoundland & Labrador.

In May 2019, MacMillan received an honorary degree from the American University of Paris.

In May 2020, MacMillan was admitted as an Honorary Fellow of the Learned Society of Wales.

She was made a member of the Order of Merit in 2022.

Articles and other media
MacMillan often appears in the popular and literary press, with a focus on events surrounding the First World War.  Examples in 2014 include her retrospective trip to Sarajevo on the centenary of the assassination of Archduke Franz Ferdinand, and interview wherein she saw similarities between then and 100 years before, remarked on the 2014 Crimean crisis and her perception that Vladimir Putin deplored Russia's place in contemporary politics, mentioned Iraq and the contention between China and Japan over the Senkaku Islands, and promoted the diplomatic corps.

In September 2013, she was interviewed upon the release of her book The War That Ended Peace: The Road to 1914, and was invited to lecture at the Bill Graham Centre for Contemporary International History on "How Wars Start: The Outbreak of the First World War" near when she received an honorary doctorate from Huron College at the University of Western Ontario. She perceived similar tensions then with the Syrian civil war and the events in Sarajevo.

MacMillan has written several op-eds for The New York Times. In December 2013, they abridged an essay of hers from the Brookings Institution, in which she wrote that "Globalization can have the paradoxical effect of fostering intense localism and nativism, frightening people into taking refuge in small like-minded groups. Globalization also makes possible the widespread transmission of radical ideologies and the bringing together of fanatics who will stop at nothing in their quest for the perfect society", and urged Western leaders to "build a stable international order" based on "a moment of real danger" which would unite the population in "coalitions able and willing to act".

On the ten-year anniversary of the 11 September attacks in New York, MacMillan wrote an essay on the consequences of the acts, in which she dismissed the power of Osama bin Laden and stressed the secular nature of the Arab Spring revolutions that deposed Hosni Mubarak and Zine El Abidine Ben Ali.  She concluded with the sentence "We should not let that horror distract us from what did not happen afterward."

In August 2014, MacMillan was one of 200 public figures who were signatories to a letter to The Guardian opposing Scottish independence in the run-up to September's referendum on that issue.

Bibliography

Books
 
 Women of the Raj. Thames and Hudson, 1988; 
 Canada and NATO: Uneasy Past, Uncertain Future. Edited with David Sorenson. Waterloo, 1990. 
 The Uneasy Century: International Relations 1900–1990. Kendall/Hunt, 1996.
 Parties Long Estranged: Canada and Australia in the Twentieth Century. Co-authored with Francine McKenzie. University of British Columbia, 2003.
 Peacemakers: The Paris Peace Conference of 1919 and Its Attempt to End War. John Murray 2001/2002/2003. 
 
 Canada's House: Rideau Hall and the Invention of a Canadian Home. Co-authored with Marjorie Harris and Anne L. Desjardins. Knopf Canada, 2004
 Nixon in China: The Week That Changed the World. Viking Canada, 2006.
 
 The Uses and Abuses of History. Penguin Canada, 2008; 
 
 

Canadian edition: 
U.S. edition:

Critical studies and reviews of MacMillan's work
Nixon and Mao

References

Further reading

 MacMillan, Margaret. "On Becoming an Historian" 23 February 2021 online at H-DIPLO, autobiographical essay.
 MacMillan, Margaret, and Patrick Quinton-Brown. "The uses of history in international society: from the Paris peace conference to the present." International Affairs 95.1 (2019): 181–200 online.
 Review of The War That Ended Peace.

External links 

 
Radio interview with Margaret MacMillan (2003) Fresh Air, NPR
Biography of Margaret Olwen MacMillan at Foreign Affairs and International Trade Canada
 Margaret MacMillan audio interview 12/2006,  The Commentary, Joseph Planta
 Margaret MacMillan television interview 2009-11-13 with Allan Gregg on TVOntario
 Margaret MacMillan: The Road to 1914 (Nov 11, 2014)  The Agenda with Steve Paikin
 Margaret MacMillan: Reith Lectures 2018

In Depth interview with MacMillan, April 4, 2004

1943 births
Living people
Alumni of St Antony's College, Oxford
Alumni of St Hilda's College, Oxford
20th-century Canadian historians
Canadian people of Scottish descent
Canadian people of Welsh descent
Historians of World War I
Companions of the Order of Canada
Writers from Toronto
University of Toronto alumni
Academic staff of Toronto Metropolitan University
Trinity College (Canada) alumni
Academic staff of the University of Toronto
Governor General's Award-winning non-fiction writers
Fellows of the Royal Society of Literature
Canadian military historians
Wardens of St Antony's College, Oxford
Women military writers
Women academic administrators
Canadian academic administrators
Canadian Members of the Order of the Companions of Honour
Members of the Order of Merit
Rhodes Trustees
Canadian women historians
International relations historians
21st-century Canadian historians
Lloyd George family